Apremont is a commune in the department of Ardennes in the Grand Est region of northern France.

Geography
Apremont is located some 40 km north-west of Verdun, 6 km north-west of Varennes-en-Argonne, and 5 km south-east of Fléville. The south-western border of the commune is the border between the departments of Ardennes and Marne while the south-eastern border is the border between Ardennes and Meuse departments. Access to the commune is by the D946 road from Fléville in the north-west passing through the eastern part of the commune and continuing to Varennes-en-Argonne. Access to the village is by the D242 running off the D946. There are also the D42 road from Chatel-Chéhéry to the north to the village and the D442 from the village west to the commune border where it becomes the D66 and continues to join the D63. More than half of the commune is heavily forested in the west while the smaller eastern portion is farmland.

The Aire river flows through the commune from west to east near the village and forms part of the northern border of the commune. The Ruisseau de Chaudron flows from the north-east into the Aire.

Neighbouring communes and villages

History
On April 18, 1918, French and American troops fought German forces near the town. Many participants were from Massachusetts and there is a park in Westfield, Massachusetts to honor those who fought in the battle.
In October 1918 this town was the site of a battle between the U.S. Army's 28th (Pennsylvania) Division and German forces.

Administration

List of Successive Mayors

Demography
In 2017 the commune had 117 inhabitants.

See also
Communes of the Ardennes department

External links
Apremont on the old National Geographic Institute website 
Apremont on Géoportail, National Geographic Institute (IGN) website 
Apremont on the 1750 Cassini Map

References

Communes of Ardennes (department)